Dylan Ragolle (born 11 May 1994) is a Belgian footballer who currently plays for Dender EH.

External links

1994 births
Living people
Belgian footballers
K.V. Kortrijk players
K.S.V. Roeselare players
K Beerschot VA players
R. Wallonia Walhain Chaumont-Gistoux players
F.C.V. Dender E.H. players
Sportspeople from Tournai
Footballers from Hainaut (province)
Association football midfielders
Belgian Pro League players
Challenger Pro League players